Waberthwaite is a civil parish in the Borough of Copeland, Cumbria, England. It contains six listed buildings that are recorded in the National Heritage List for England. Of these, one is listed at Grade II*, the middle of the three grades, and the others are at Grade II, the lowest grade.  The parish contains the villages of Waberthwaite, Newbiggin, and Corney, and is otherwise rural.  The listed buildings comprise a church, a sundial in the churchyard, farmhouses, and a guidestone.


Key

Buildings

References

Citations

Sources

Lists of listed buildings in Cumbria